= Lebohang Motlomelo =

- Citizenship: Lesotho
- Occupations: Director, Film director: Director; Writer; Cinematographer.
- Notable work: Walking in the Dark; The Ghost; The Lost Cause

Lebohang Motlomelo is a Mosotho filmmaker, director, writer and cinematographer.

== Filmography ==
- Walking in the Dark
- The Ghost
- The Lost Cause

== Awards ==
He won his first award or recognized locally with the movie The Ghost and had international recognition with the film.
